Seen may refer to:

 Seen (album), by Tom Bailey, 2001
 Seen (artist) (born 1961), American graffiti artist
 Seen (Winterthur), a district of Winterthur, Switzerland
 Shin (letter), or Seen in Arabic, a Semitic abjad

See also
 Xian (disambiguation), also transliterated as Seen
 Scene (disambiguation)